Stop Making Sense is a live album by American rock band Talking Heads, the soundtrack to the film of the same name. It was released in September 1984 and features nine tracks from the film, albeit with treatment and editing. The album spent over two years on the Billboard 200 chart. It was their first album to be distributed by EMI outside North America.

Limited pressings of the original LP version featured a full-colour picture book wrapped around the album jacket; standard versions had many of the pictures (printed in black and white) and captions on the album's inner sleeve. The CD release of the album includes the full-colour book, but it rearranges the layout to conform to the dimensions of a square CD booklet (compared to the vertically-oriented rectangular shape of the LP book). In 1999, a 16-track re-release—with content and sound closely matching those of the film—coincided with the 15th anniversary of the concert filming. An expanded 40th anniversary edition is to be released by Rhino Records in 2023, marking the first official release of the complete concert recording, alongside a theatrical re-release of the film by A24.

The album was ranked number 345 on Rolling Stone magazine's list of the 500 greatest albums of all time. In 2000, it was voted number 394 in Colin Larkin's All Time Top 1000 Albums. In 2012, Slant Magazine listed the album at #61 on its list of "Best Albums of the 1980s".

Background and recording
Frantz stated in the liner notes of Once in a Lifetime: The Best of Talking Heads, "When ["Slippery People"] was originally recorded on Speaking in Tongues, it had a funky and compact sound. This Stop Making Sense version is funky and big as a house. (Or should I say church?)"

Reception

"A bona fide classic," opined Neil Jeffries in a five-star review of the reissue for Empire, "a perfectly measured snapshot of a widely loved and respected band playing at the height of their powers ... No other band could do this. No other music movie soundtrack sounds this good." "A timely reminder of the achievements of perhaps the most underrated band of the post-punk age," concurred Q. "From its stripped-down intro ... to the nine-piece finale, Stop Making Sense remains heady, stirring stuff."

Track listing
All songs written by David Byrne, Chris Frantz, Jerry Harrison, Tina Weymouth except as noted.

Side one
 "Psycho Killer" (Byrne, Frantz, Weymouth) – 4:28
 "Swamp" – 3:50 (LP) 4:28 (cassette, CD)
 "Slippery People" – 3:35 (LP) 4:13 (different mix; cassette, CD)
 "Burning Down the House" – 4:14
 "Girlfriend Is Better" (Byrne) – 3:32 (LP) 5:07 (cassette, CD)

Side two
 "Once in a Lifetime" (Byrne, Brian Eno, Frantz, Harrison, Weymouth) – 4:34 (LP) 5:34 (cassette, CD)
 "What a Day That Was" (Byrne) – 5:08 (LP) 6:30 (cassette, CD)
 "Life During Wartime" – 4:52 (LP) 5:52 (cassette, CD)
 "Take Me to the River" (Al Green, Teenie Hodges) – 6:00

Film/Special New Edition Soundtrack
Bonus live tracks "Heaven" and "This Must Be the Place (Naive Melody)" were available as B-sides on various US 7-inch and UK 12-inch singles during the album's original release.  These versions were released on the Special Edition soundtrack.

 "Psycho Killer" (Byrne, Frantz, Weymouth) – 4:24
 "Heaven" (Byrne, Harrison) – 3:41
 "Thank You for Sending Me an Angel" (Byrne) – 2:09
 "Found a Job" (Byrne) – 3:15
 "Slippery People" – 4:00
 "Burning Down the House" – 4:06
 "Life During Wartime" – 5:51
 "Making Flippy Floppy" – 4:40
 "Swamp" – 4:30
 "What a Day That Was" (Byrne) – 6:00
 "This Must Be the Place (Naive Melody)" – 4:57
 "Once in a Lifetime" (Byrne, Eno, Frantz, Harrison, Weymouth) – 5:25
 "Genius of Love" (Weymouth, Frantz, Adrian Belew, Steven Stanley) (performed by Tom Tom Club) – 4:30
 "Girlfriend Is Better" – 5:06
 "Take Me to the River" (Green, Hodges) – 5:32
 "Crosseyed and Painless" (Byrne, Eno, Frantz, Harrison, Weymouth) – 6:11

Personnel
David Byrne – guitar, vocals
Chris Frantz – drums, vocals
Jerry Harrison – guitar, keyboards, vocals
Tina Weymouth – bass guitar, synth bass, guitar, vocals

Additional personnel
Bernie Worrell – keyboards
Alex Weir – guitar, vocals
Steve Scales – percussion
Ednah Holt – backing vocals
Lynn Mabry – backing vocals

Production
Talking Heads, Gary Goetzman – producers
Ted Jensen at Sterling Sound, NYC – mastering

Charts

Weekly charts

Year-end charts

Certifications and sales

References

Bibliography
 

1984 live albums
1984 soundtrack albums
Concert film soundtracks
Sire Records live albums
Sire Records soundtracks
Talking Heads live albums